HNLMS Van Speijk (F802) was a frigate of the . The ship was in service with the Royal Netherlands Navy from 1967 to 1986. The ship's radio call sign was "PAVA". She was sold to the Indonesian Navy where the ship was renamed KRI Slamet Riyadi (352). The ship was decommissioned in 2019.

Design and construction
In the early 1960s, the Royal Netherlands Navy had an urgent requirement to replace its s, obsolete ex-American escorts built during the Second World War. To meet this requirement, it chose to build a modified version of the British  as its , using broadly the same armament as the original design, but where possible, substituting Dutch electronics and radars.

Displacement was  standard and  full load.

A twin 4.5-inch (113 mm) Mark 6 gun mount was fitted forward. Anti-aircraft defence was provided by two quadruple Sea Cat surface-to-air missile launchers on the hangar roof. A Limbo anti-submarine mortar was fitted aft to provide a short-range anti-submarine capability, while a hangar and  helicopter deck allowed a single Westland Wasp helicopter to be operated, for longer range anti-submarine and anti-surface operations.

As built, Van Speijk was fitted with a Signaal LW-03 long range air search radar on the ship's mainmast, with a DA02 medium range air/surface surveillance radar carried on the ship's foremast. M44 and M45 fire control radars were provided for the Seacat missiles and ships guns respectively. The ship had a sonar suite of Type 170B attack sonar and Type 162 bottom search sonar. The ship had a crew of 251, later reduced to 180.

Modifications
All six Van Speijks were modernised in the 1970s, using many of the systems used by the new s. The 4.5-inch gun was replaced by a single OTO Melara 76 mm and launchers for up to eight Harpoon anti-ship missiles fitted (although only two were normally carried). The hangar and flight deck were enlarged, allowing a Westland Lynx helicopter to be carried, while the Limbo mortar was removed, with a pair of triple Mk 32 torpedo launchers providing close-in anti-submarine armament. A Signaal DA03 radar replaced the DA02 radar and an American EDO Corporation CWE-610 sonar replaced the original British sonar. Van Speijk was modernised at the Den Helder naval dockyard between 24 December 1976 and 3 January 1979.

Dutch service history
An order for four Van Speijks was placed in 1962, with two more ordered in 1964. Van Speijk herself was laid down at the Amsterdam shipyard of Nederlandsche Dok en Scheepsbouw Maatschappij on 1 October 1963 and was launched on 5 March 1965. The ship was completed and entered service on 14 February 1967 with the pennant number F802.

The ship received a mid-life modernization in Den Helder, starting on 24 December 1976 and lasting till 3 January 1979.

The ships returned to Den Helder on 19 May 1982.

From 1983 to 1984 Van Speijk served as stationship in the Netherlands Antilles.

The four ships then were purchased by Indonesia. Van Speijk was decommissioned in early 1986 and transferred to the Indonesian Navy on 1 November 1986.

Indonesian service history
On 11 February 1986, Indonesia and the Netherlands signed an agreement for transfer of two Van Speijk class with option on two more ships. The ship was transferred to Indonesia on 1 November 1986 and renamed KRI Slamet Riyadi on joining the Indonesian Navy, with the pennant number 352.

By 2002, the ships Seacat missiles were inoperable and it was reported that propulsion problems were badly effecting the availability of the ships of this class. Slamet Riyadi was then modernized by PT Tesco Indomaritim, which was completed in 2008. The ship's Seacat launchers were replaced by two Simbad twin launchers for Mistral anti-aircraft missiles, and she was re-engined with two  Caterpiller 3616 diesel engines. As the Indonesian Navy retired Harpoon missile from its stockpiles, Slamet Riyadi was rearmed with Chinese C-802 missiles.

Slamet Riyadi was decommissioned on 16 August 2019, along with five other ships of the Indonesian Navy.

After she was decommissioned, her OTO Melara 76 mm gun system is reused for naval gunnery training at naval weapons range in Paiton, Probolinggo Regency, East Java. As of June 2020, the ship's hulk are planned to be sunk offshore of Karangasem Regency, Bali to be utilized as dive attraction.

Notes

Bibliography

External links

KRI Slamet Riyadi featured on Indonesian TV show "Garuda" by NET.

Van Speijk-class frigates
1965 ships
Ships built in Amsterdam